Card Hero may refer to:

Trade & Battle: Card Hero, a 2000 Game Boy Color title
Kousoku Card Battle: Card Hero, a 2007 Nintendo DS title